Anthony Fisher (born 24 January 1994) is an Australian professional basketball player who last played for the Cairns Marlins of the NBL1 North. He spent time with the Perth Wildcats between 2013 and 2015. After four years as a development player and an extended squad member of the Cairns Taipans, he earned a full-time contract with the club in 2019. In 2016, he helped the Marlins win the QBL championship.

Early life
Born and raised in Ballarat, Fisher started playing basketball locally at age 9. He started in Ballarat's domestic competitions and then rose through the ranks of the Ballarat representative program.

Basketball career

Ballarat Miners and Australia representative (2011–2013)
As a 17-year-old in 2011, Fisher debuted for the Ballarat Miners in the South East Australian Basketball League (SEABL) and was named the Victorian Country Athlete of the Year. On 1 December 2011, Fisher rejected an Australian Institute of Sport scholarship to stay and complete his Victorian Certificate of Education (VCE) at Ballarat High School.

In 2012, Fisher represented Australia at the Albert Schweitzer Tournament and the FIBA Oceania Under-18 Championship. He also played for the Miners in the SEABL. In 2013, he played for Australia at the FIBA Under-19 World Championship and spent a third season with the Miners.

Perth Wildcats (2013–2015)
In September 2013, Fisher had a week-long trial with the Perth Wildcats of the NBL, hoping to gain a development player spot. He was ultimately unsuccessful, but returned to Ballarat with a program put in place by the Wildcats to help him get stronger. In January 2014, Fisher returned to Perth for a two-week stint with the Wildcats, where on 17 January, he made his NBL debut by playing the final 50 seconds of the Wildcats' 97–72 win over the New Zealand Breakers.

With the Miners in 2014, Fisher averaged 14.3 points, 5.5 rebounds and 3.0 assists in 26 games.

On 7 August 2014, Fisher signed with the Perth Wildcats as a full-time development player. He appeared in eight games during the 2014–15 NBL season. 

With the Miners in 2015, Fisher averaged 12.1 points, 6.0 rebounds and 2.4 assists in 25 games.

Cairns Taipans and Marlins (2015–2021)
On 10 September 2015, Fisher signed with the Cairns Taipans as a development player and appeared in two games during the 2015–16 NBL season. Fisher remained in Cairns for the off-season and helped the Cairns Marlins win the 2016 QBL championship. In 19 games for the Marlins in 2016, he averaged 11.6 points, 6.2 rebounds and 3.6 assists per game.

Fisher re-joined the Taipans as a development player for the 2016–17 NBL season. He again appeared in two games, and in April 2017, he re-joined the Marlins for the QBL season. In 17 games for the Marlins, he averaged 13.29 points per game. Fisher returned for a third season as a Taipans development player in 2017–18, and appeared in four games. In April 2018, he re-joined the Marlins for a third season. He helped the Marlins reach the QBL Grand Final series in 2018 and was named team MVP. In 22 games, he averaged 18.1 points, 6.1 rebounds, 3.4 assists and 1.2 steals per game.

Fisher transitioned to a training player with the Taipans for the 2018–19 season, and was recognised for his commitment to the team by being named Club Person of the Year. With the Marlins in 2019, he averaged 16.5 points, 6.9 rebounds, 3.6 assists and 1.4 steals in 19 games.

On 13 August 2019, Fisher signed with the Taipans for the 2019–20 season, joining the team on a full-time contract for the first time. He scored 12 points in 15 games.

In 2021, Fisher rejoined the Marlins for the inaugural NBL1 North season.

References

External links

Cairns Taipans player profile
FIBA.com profile
SEABL stats
NBL stats
Ballarat Miner continues in NBL

1994 births
Living people
Australian men's basketball players
Cairns Taipans players
People educated at Ballarat High School
Perth Wildcats players
Point guards
Sportspeople from Ballarat